TV Globo Pernambuco (channel 13) is a television station licensed to Recife, Pernambuco, Brazil broadcasting TV Globo programming for most of the state of Pernambunco and is owned by Grupo Globo. It broadcasts its programming to 54 municipalities in the state, for TV Asa Branca and TV Grande Rio, in addition to having a retransmission in the Fernando de Noronha archipelago.

History 
TV Globo Recife, currently TV Globo Pernambuco, was inaugurated. The station, like the one in São Paulo, was purchased from Organizações Victor Costa. Located in the capital of Pernambuco, since 2018, Globo Nordeste operates from its headquarters located in the Santo Amaro neighborhood. Globo Nordeste is one of the five stations owned by Grupo Globo. It has a very strong regional programming, with transmissions of Carnival, Paixão de Cristo, and São João, and also produces numerous documentaries and programs with the local music scene, in addition to the special São João do Nordeste, which brings great names of Northeastern music. It also broadcast the Copa Nordeste de Futebol, which currently belongs to SBT.
The Pernambuco branch was inaugurated on April 22, 1972, within the period established by DENTEL between the grant and the beginning of transmissions. To commemorate the following, an edition was shown the next day, for all of Brazil, for all of Brazil, live from the opening of Esporte, directly on the day of the edition of Chacrinha de Esporte, directly at the Ginásio Geraldo Magalhães.

Because it was implemented in a hurry, the station started its operations in a precarious way. With poor signal quality (irregular in some states) and equipment reused from other branches. Their studios were located at the top of Morro do Peludo in Olinda, while the journalism department and the commercial sector were located in the Ambassador Building in downtown Recife. In addition, the network's programming arrived up to two days late, as the tapes came in a pouch by plane. With the exception of only the TV news, shown live.

Current Programs 
In addition to broadcasting TV Globo’s national programming, Globo Nordeste generates the following programs:
 Good morning Pernambuco
 NETV 1
 NETV 2
 Globo Esporte PE
 It's Popcorn
 Globe Community
 NE Radar

Programs by Season 
 PE Space
 Northeast Summer
 Northeast Winter
 Northeast Living and Preserving
 Stories & Tales

Specials and Musicals 
 Luiz Gonzaga Special (2007)
 Reginaldo Rossi: 40 Years of Reign (2007)
 Elba Ramalho: Cordas, Gonzaga e Afins (2014)
 Lucy Alves (2015)
 Chico Science: Electric Crab
 Reginaldo Rossi: My Great Love
 Sound of Earth: 40 Years
 Legends and Hauntings of Recife

Extinct Programs 
 NETV 3
 NETV Sunday
 Jornal das Sete
 Final Throw

References

External links 
 

Television channels and stations established in 1972
Television stations in Brazil
TV Globo affiliates